Zakhar Aleksandrovich Tarasenko (born 12 October 1997) is a Russian football player who plays for FC KAMAZ Naberezhnye Chelny.

Club career
He made his debut in the Russian Football National League for FC Olimp-Dolgoprudny on 10 July 2021 in a game against FC Neftekhimik Nizhnekamsk.

References

External links
 
 Profile by Russian Football National League

1997 births
People from Ukhta
Sportspeople from the Komi Republic
Living people
Russian footballers
Association football forwards
FC TSK Simferopol players
FC Sevastopol (Russia) players
FC Olimp-Dolgoprudny players
FC KAMAZ Naberezhnye Chelny players
Crimean Premier League players
Russian First League players